Algernon Pynegar (22 October 1883 – 23 June 1948) was an English professional footballer who played as a forward.

References

1883 births
1948 deaths
People from Heanor
Footballers from Derbyshire
English footballers
Association football forwards
Marlpool F.C. players
Whitwick White Cross F.C. players
Derby County F.C. players
Grimsby Town F.C. players
Rotherham Town F.C. (1899) players
Rotherham County F.C. players
Tottenham Hotspur F.C. players
Denaby United F.C. players
Heanor United F.C. players
English Football League players